SCinet is the high-performance network built annually by volunteers in support of SC (formerly Supercomputing, the International Conference for High Performance Computing, Networking, Storage and Analysis).
SCinet is the primary network for the yearly conference and is used by attendees and exhibitors to demonstrate and test high-performance computing and networking applications.

International Community 

SCinet is also a hub for the international networking community. It provides a platform to share the latest research, technologies, and demonstrations for networks, network technology providers, and even software developers who are in charge of supporting HPC communities at their own institutions or organizations.

Volunteers 

Nearly 200 volunteers from educational institutions, high performance
computing sites, equipment vendors, research and education networks, government agencies and telecommunications carriers collaborate via technology and in-person to design, build and operate SCinet. 

While many of these credentialed individuals have volunteered at SCinet for years, first timers join the team each year. They include international
students and participants in the National Science Foundation-funded Women in IT Networking at SC (WINS) program. The 2017 SCinet team included women and men from high performance computing institutions in the U.S. and throughout the world.

History 

Originated in 1991 as an initiative within the SC conference to provide networking to attendees, SCinet has grown to become the "World's Fastest Network" during the duration of the conference. For 29 years, SCinet has provided SC attendees and the high performance computing (HPC) community with the innovative network platform necessary to internationally interconnect, transport, and display HPC research during SC.

Historically, SCinet has been used as a platform to test networking technology and applications which have found their way into common use.

Research and development 

In the past years, SCinet deployed conference wide networking technologies such as ATM, FDDI, HiPPi before they were deployed commercially.

References

External links 
https://sc18.supercomputing.org/experience/scinet/
http://scinet.supercomputing.org
http://www.supercomputing.org
http://sc.delaat.net/

Computer networks